The Poor Law (Scotland) Act 1845 was an Act of Parliament that reformed the Poor Law system of Scotland.

Main provisions
 The creation of a Board of Supervision to regulate the Poor Law system.
 A retention of the parish-based system through Parochial Boards
 Powers for the Parochial Boards to raise taxes
 Poor relief could continue to be in the form of outdoor relief, poorhouses could be built to aid the sick
 Parishes should join together to build poorhouses
 An Inspector of the Poor decided whether applications for poor relief were legitimate

See also
 Old Scottish Poor Law

References

Scottish Poor Laws
United Kingdom Acts of Parliament 1845
19th century in Scotland
1845 in Scotland
Acts of the Parliament of the United Kingdom concerning Scotland